Pablo Ibáñez Lumbreras (born 20 September 1998) is a Spanish footballer who plays as a central midfielder for CA Osasuna.

Club career
Born in Pamplona, Ibáñez joined CA Osasuna's youth setup in 2005, aged seven. After leaving the club in 2014, he represented UD Mutilvera and AD San Juan, and finished his formation with the latter in 2017.

Ibáñez made his senior debut with San Juan on 19 August 2017, starting in a 3–0 Tercera División away win over CD Egüés. He scored his first senior goal on 16 December, in a 2–2 home draw against CD Baztán KE.

A regular starter, Ibáñez moved to fellow fourth tier side Mutilvera in August 2019, and helped in the club's promotion to Segunda División B during his first season. On 1 February 2021, he returned to his first club Osasuna on an 18-month contract, being initially assigned to the reserves also in the third division.

On 9 March 2022, Ibáñez renewed his contract with the Rojillos until 2024, being definitely promoted to the main squad ahead of the 2022–23 campaign. He made his professional – and La Liga – debut on 12 August, in a 2–1 home win over Sevilla FC.

References

External links

1998 births
Living people
Footballers from Pamplona
Spanish footballers
Association football midfielders
La Liga players
Segunda Federación players
Segunda División B players
Tercera División players
UD Mutilvera players
CA Osasuna B players
CA Osasuna players